The 2017 Troféu Joaquim Agostinho–GP Internacional Torres Vedras was a road cycling stage race that took place in the Centro region of Portugal between 5 and 9 July 2017. The race was rated as a 2.2 event as part of the 2017 UCI Europe Tour, and was the 40th edition of the Troféu Joaquim Agostinho.

Teams 

The 16 teams invited to the race were:

Stages

Classification leadership 

 In stage two, Adrián González, who was second in the combination classification, wore the purple jersey, because first placed Pablo Guerrero wore the blue jersey as leader of the mountains classification.
 In the first sector of stage three, Frederico Figueiredo, who was second in the mountains classification, wore the blue jersey, because first placed Amaro Antunes wore the grey jersey as leader of the points classification.
 In the first sector of stage three, João Rodrigues, who was second in the young rider classification, wore the orange jersey, because first placed José Fernandes wore the yellow jersey as leader of the general classification.
 In the first sector of stage three, Rinaldo Nocentini, who was fourth in the combination classification, wore the purple jersey, because first placed Amaro Antunes wore the grey jersey as leader of the points classification, and second placed Frederico Figueiredo wore the blue jersey as leader of the mountains classification and third placed José Fernandes wore the yellow jersey as leader of the general classification.
 In the second sector of stage three, João Rodrigues, who was second in the young rider classification, wore the orange jersey, because first placed José Fernandes wore the yellow jersey as leader of the general classification.
 In the second sector of stage three, Frederico Figueiredo, who was second in the combination classification, wore the purple jersey, because first placed Amaro Antunes wore the blue jersey as leader of the mountains classification.
 In stage four, Vicente García de Mateos, who was third in the combination classification, wore the purple jersey, because first placed Amaro Antunes wore the yellow jersey as leader of the general classification and second placed Frederico Figueiredo wore the blue jersey as leader of the mountains classification.

Final standings

General classification

Points classification

Mountains classification

Sprints classification

Young rider classification

Combination classification

Team classification

References

External links 
 

Troféu Joaquim Agostinho
Troféu Joaquim Agostinho